Pinelands Regional School District is a regional school district in Ocean County, New Jersey, United States, serving students from Eagleswood Township, Little Egg Harbor Township and Tuckerton Borough along with the Burlington County municipality of Bass River Township. Both schools are accredited by the Middle States Association of Colleges and Schools and the New Jersey Department of Education.

As of the 2019–20 school year, the district, comprised of two schools, had an enrollment of 1,564 students and 147.2 classroom teachers (on an FTE basis), for a student–teacher ratio of 10.6:1.

The district is classified by the New Jersey Department of Education as being in District Factor Group "B", the second-lowest of eight groupings. District Factor Groups organize districts statewide to allow comparison by common socioeconomic characteristics of the local districts. From the lowest socioeconomic status to highest, the categories are A, B, CD, DE, FG, GH, I and J.

History
Pinelands Regional High School officially opened on September 5, 1979, as a Junior-Senior High School, originally housing students in seventh through twelfth grades from Tuckerton, Little Egg Harbor, Bass River, and Eagleswood. Prior to the opening of the school, students from those communities had attended Southern Regional School District in the Manahawkin section of Stafford Township, which had been dealing for years with overcrowding.

The building originally held grades 7–8 on the third floor, 9–10 on the second, and 11–12 on the first. The building featured an experimental "open classroom" design, where a large group of students of varying skill levels would be in a single, large classroom with several teachers overseeing them; and contained no interior walls. However, this format didn't last long, and in the 1980s, the rooms were walled off and separated by floor-to-ceiling folding partitions.

In 1991, Pinelands Middle School opened across the street for students in grades 7–8. Also in the 1990s, a new building was completed next to the high school, which houses a daycare center called "Rainbow Express". Students taking childcare classes attend class in this building to help with the daycare kids. In 2002, the Middle School was expanded and the 9th grade was moved there. When the expansion was completed at the Middle School, it was renamed "Pinelands Regional Junior High School" while the high school was formally renamed the "Senior High School".

In 2017, voters approved a bond referendum for renovations to both schools, including new roofing, bathrooms, new masonry in the High School building, and other cosmetic and safety upgrades. Renovation work on the High School was halted after workers discovered asbestos and roofing nails dislodged in the commons area. The high school building was closed for the entirety of the 2018–2019 school year while renovations were completed; portable classrooms were installed at the junior high school to accommodate five grades of students, while 7th graders attended the nearby Frog Pond Elementary School.

In 2018 Melissa McCooley, already superintendent of Little Egg Harbor schools, also became superintendent of Pinelands Regional schools, having two positions at one time.

In September 2019, the high school re-opened, housing grades 9-12 for the first time since 2002.

Schools

Schools in the district (with 2019–20 enrollment data from the National Center for Education Statistics) are:
Pinelands Regional Junior High School had 542 students in grades 7–8.  Opened in September 1991. 
F. Eric Pschorr, Principal
Kimberly Clark, Assistant Principal
Pinelands Regional High School had 1,006 students in grades 9–12.  Opened in September 1979. 
Troy Henderson, Principal
Justin Loomis, Assistant Principal
Matthew Maleski, Assistant Principal
Amy Nass, Assistant Principal

Both schools are located directly across the street from each other on Nugentown Road, near the border of Little Egg Harbor and Tuckerton.

WCAT
WCAT is a Television station on local channel 21 for the area that the district serves. Most of the cast and crew is made up of students who take the class as an elective. The channel shows live morning announcements at 7:32am daily, followed by a commercial or short skit made by members of the WCAT class. Throughout the day, especially during lunch periods, other school programs or past school events are shown on the channel, usually shown on TVs in the cafeteria. Throughout the rest of the day, however, the channel is composed of school or community announcements typical of public-access television cable TV networks.

Pinelands Experience
The Pinelands Experience was a three-day program for 7th graders entering the district, usually held in mid-October. Student chaperones from 9th grade and up are assigned to chaperone students. It was formerly an overnight camping trip that was eventually scaled down to in 2002 due in part to hazing performed by upperclassmen, as well as budget cuts. The Pinelands Experience was canceled in 2010 but returned in 2019.

Notable faculty
 Sarann Kraushaar, former vice-principal of the school, who was the mistress of murderer Robert O. Marshall, whose slayings inspired the bestselling book Blind Faith, and was later a miniseries of the same name, in which a character based on Kraushaar and a fictional incarnation of the school is featured.
 Lily McBeth (born 1934), transgender former substitute teacher at the school who made national news after she underwent a sex-change operation.

Administration
Core members of the district's administration are:
Dr. Melissa McCooley, Superintendent
Nick Brown, Business Administrator / Board Secretary

Board of education
The district's board of education, comprised of nine members, sets policy and oversees the fiscal and educational operation of the district through its administration. As a Type II school district, the board's trustees are elected directly by voters to serve three-year terms of office on a staggered basis, with three seats up for election each year held (since 2012) as part of the November general election. The board appoints a superintendent to oversee the day-to-day operation of the district. Representatives are elected on the basis of the constituent population, with six seats allocated to Little Egg Harbor Township, and one each allocated to Bass River Township, Eagleswood Township and Tuckerton.

References

External links
Pinelands Regional School District

School Data for the Pinelands Regional School District, National Center for Education Statistics

Bass River Township, New Jersey
Eagleswood Township, New Jersey
Little Egg Harbor Township, New Jersey
Tuckerton, New Jersey
Education in Burlington County, New Jersey
New Jersey District Factor Group B
Pine Barrens (New Jersey)
School districts in Ocean County, New Jersey